Haskins is a village in Wood County, Ohio, United States. The population was 1,188 at the 2010 census.

History
Haskins was platted in 1862 when the railroad was extended to that point. A post office called Haskins was established in 1861. The village was incorporated in 1869.

Geography
Haskins is located at  (41.465152, -83.706984).

Demographics

2010 census
As of the census of 2000, of 2010, there were 1,188 people, 409 households, and 322 families living in the village. The racial makeup of the village was 97.4% White, 0.4% African American, 0.3% Asian, 0.9% from other races, and 0.9% from two or more races. Hispanic or Latino of any race were 4.1% of the population.

There were 409 households, out of which 47.4% had children under the age of 18 living with them, 65.8% were married couples living together, 8.6% had a female householder with no husband present, 4.4% had a male householder with no wife present, and 21.3% were non-families. 17.6% of all households were made up of individuals, and 5.7% had someone living alone who was 65 years of age or older. The average household size was 2.90 and the average family size was 3.29.

The median age in the village was 32.3 years. 33.8% of residents were under the age of 18; 4.5% were between the ages of 18 and 24; 33.9% were from 25 to 44; 22.2% were from 45 to 64; and 5.5% were 65 years of age or older. The gender makeup of the village was 50.1% male and 49.9% female.

2000 census
As of the census of 2000, there were 638 people, 241 households, and 169 families living in the village. The population density was 417.7 people per square mile (161.0/km2). There were 251 housing units at an average density of 164.3/sq mi (63.3/km2). The racial makeup of the village was 97.65% White, 0.16% African American, 0.63% Asian, 1.25% from other races, and 0.31% from two or more races. Hispanic or Latino of any race were 3.29% of the population.

There were 241 households, out of which 40.7% had children under the age of 18 living with them, 59.8% were married couples living together, 6.6% had a female householder with no husband present, and 29.5% were non-families. 25.7% of all households were made up of individuals, and 10.4% had someone living alone who was 65 years of age or older. The average household size was 2.65 and the average family size was 3.18.

In the village, the population was spread out, with 29.2% under the age of 18, 8.3% from 18 to 24, 33.5% from 25 to 44, 18.3% from 45 to 64, and 10.7% who were 65 years of age or older. The median age was 34 years. For every 100 females there were 100.6 males. For every 100 females age 18 and over, there were 104.5 males.

The median income for a household in the village was $45,625, and the median income for a family was $55,208. Males had a median income of $36,538 versus $27,500 for females. The per capita income for the village was $17,696. About 5.3% of families and 4.8% of the population were below the poverty line, including 1.6% of those under age 18 and 8.0% of those age 65 or over.

Notable residents 

 Hazel Stiebeling, who helped establish USDA dietary requirements, was born in Haskins.

References

Villages in Wood County, Ohio
Villages in Ohio